Arthur Robert Smith (16 February 1872 – 20 July 1961) was an Australian rules footballer who played for Collingwood in the years leading up to and following the formation of the Victorian Football League (VFL).

Playing career
Smith, who was recruited from Richmond Football Club, was Collingwood's main target up forward during his career. Smith made his VFL debut in Collingwood's inaugural VFL game, against St Kilda Football Club in round one, 1897, and went on to top their goal-kicking in each of his first four seasons. Smith's tally of 31 goals in 1898 was enough to win the VFL Leading Goalkicker Medal. Although he wasn't the most prolific forward for Collingwood in 1901, his 30 goals helped his club reach the 1901 VFL Grand Final, where they lost to Essendon.

His career total of 205 goals was a club record until broken by Dick Lee in 1910.

References

External links

1872 births
1961 deaths
Australian rules footballers from Melbourne
Australian Rules footballers: place kick exponents
Collingwood Football Club players
Richmond Football Club (VFA) players
VFL Leading Goalkicker Medal winners
People from Prahran, Victoria